State liability is the legal liability of a state. It refer to the liability of an organ of state or public authority in that state's own domestic legal system, typically under special principles within the law of tort.

See also 
 Misfeasance in public office

Tort law
Administrative law